Ever Alexander Rivera Guerrero (born 27 December 1992 in Sapuyes) is a Colombian cyclist riding for 4-72 Colombia.

Palmares
2010
3rd Colombian National Road Race Championships juniors
2013
3rd Vuelta Ciclista a León
10th Coupe des nations Ville Saguenay
Mountains classification

References

1992 births
Living people
Colombian male cyclists